Risālat al-Ghayba ('Epistle of Occultation') may refer to:

, a work written in 1021 by the Druze leader Hamza ibn Ali after the disappearance of the Fatimid Imam-caliph al-Hakim bi-Amr Allah (985–1021), announcing al-Hakim's concealment or occultation
, a work written in 1042 by Hamza ibn Ali's pupil Baha al-Din al-Muqtana, announcing the suspension of Druze missionary activity due to the imminence of the end times

See also
Ghayba (disambiguation), the Shi'ite concept of the concealment or occultation of an Imam
 (disambiguation), the name of two Twelver Shi'ite works on the occultation of the twelfth Imam Muhammad al-Mahdi